Satanus may refer to:
Satanus, one of the half-demon brother and sister Blaze and Satanus in DC Comics
Satanus (comics), a dinosaur character in Judge Dredd and other 2000 AD comic strips
"Satanus", the seventh episode of Les Vampires